Heiberger is a small unincorporated community located about 10 miles north of Marion in Perry County, Alabama, United States. It is best known for being the birthplace of civil rights leader Coretta Scott King.

References

 Moore, F. Brooks. Pathways to and from Heiberger, Perry County, Alabama: History of the William and Annie Moore Family of Heiberger, Alabama. Published by author.

External links
 Heiberger stories

Unincorporated communities in Perry County, Alabama
Unincorporated communities in Alabama